Andrei Anatolyevich Fedyakin (born 8 June 1959) is a Russian professional football coach and a former player.

External links
 

1959 births
Sportspeople from Vladivostok
Living people
Soviet footballers
Russian footballers
Association football defenders
FC Luch Vladivostok players
Russian Premier League players
Russian football managers
FC Luch Vladivostok managers